Las Pasiones Infernales (also known as Pasiones Infernales) is a 1969 Puerto Rican-Mexican film production. It stars Velda Gonzalez, Hector Suarez, Esther Sandoval, Jaime Ruiz Escobar and Luis Antonio Cosme, among others.

Plot
The movie deals with racism in the Latino community. It concentrates on racial differences between groups of whites and Blacks-Mestizo in a Spanish-speaking island.

External links

1969 films
Mexican crime drama films
Puerto Rican films
1969 crime drama films
1960s Mexican films